Dave Hackel is an American producer and screenwriter.  He is best known for creating, writing and producing the CBS sitcom Becker, which starred Ted Danson and ran from 1998 until 2004. 

Hackel grew up in Delaware, Ohio. He later moved to Los Angeles, California in the 1970s, where he had started working as a game show staffer.  He started writing with Steve Hattman as a writing partner for television shows and for projects such as the 1980 television movie The Great American Traffic Jam. Aside from all his work on Becker, Hackel has also worked on episodes of Frasier, The Love Boat, Wings, Dear John, Out of This World, Webster, 9 to 5, Fish, LateLine, Harper Valley PTA, Gridlock, Shirley and The Pursuit of Happiness.

Hackel wrote columns for The Huffington Post, in 2011.

References

External links

Living people
Year of birth missing (living people)
American television writers
American male television writers
American television producers
HuffPost writers and columnists
20th-century American screenwriters
20th-century American male writers
21st-century American screenwriters
21st-century American male writers